William Ogilvie FRGS (April 7, 1846 in Ottawa – November 13, 1912 in Winnipeg, Manitoba) was a Canadian Dominion land surveyor, explorer and the commissioner of Yukon.

He was born on a farm in Gloucester Township, Canada West in an area now known as Glen Ogilvie to James Ogilvie of Belfast Ireland and Margaret Holliday Ogilvie of Peebles, Scotland. Ogilvie articled as a surveyor with Robert Sparks, qualifying to practice as a Provincial Land Surveyor in 1869. He married Sparks' sister Mary, a school teacher, on March 8, 1872. He worked locally as a land surveyor, qualified as a Dominion Land Surveyor in 1872 and was first hired by the Dominion government in 1875.

He was responsible for numerous surveys from the 1870s to the 1890s, mainly in the Prairie Provinces. From 1887 to 1889, Ogilvie was involved in George Mercer Dawson's exploration and survey expedition in what later became the Yukon Territory. He surveyed the Chilkoot Pass, the Yukon and Porcupine rivers. Ogilvie established the location of the boundary between the Yukon and Alaska on the 141st meridian west.

During the Klondike Gold Rush, he surveyed the townsite of Dawson City and was responsible for settling many disputes between miners. Ogilvie became the Yukon's second Commissioner in 1898 at the height of the gold rush, and resigned because of ill-health in 1901.

He was the author of Early Days on the Yukon (1913), which is still available in facsimile reprints. The Ogilvie Mountains, Ogilvie River and Ogilvie Aerodrome in the Northern Yukon Territory along with Ogilvie Valley in the Southern Yukon Territory are named after him.

Ogilvie performed the following surveys for the Surveyor-General of Canada:

 1875 – 76—Township outlines south of Dauphin.
1878 – 79—Surveys of Indian Reserves, Bow River.
1880—Township outlines West of York.
1881—Fourth meridian to Township 40.
1882—Seventh base line West of Fourth meridian.
1883—Fifth meridian from Edmonton to Athabasca River and Twenty-first base line Westerly.
1884—Micrometer survey of Peace River from Chipewyan to Dunvegan and Athabasca River from Slave River to Athabasca Landing.
1885—Traverse along C.P.R. in British Columbia.
1887—Exploration surveys—Yukon River and Mackenzie River.
1888 – 89—Surveys and explorations—Porcupine, Lewes, Bell, Trout and Peel River.
1890—Exploration survey between Lake Temiscamingue and Hudson Bay.
1891—Examination between Liard and Peace Rivers.
1892—Subdivision and re-surveys in Prince Albert District.

Legacy
'Pride and Perseverance', a Gloucester Museum display which ran September to May 1994, honoured native son William Ogilvie.

See also
North-West Mounted Police in the Canadian north

References 

 Gloucester Roots, L. Kemp (1991)
 Carleton Saga, Harry & Olive Walker (1968)
 Obituary in Annual Report of the Association of Ontario Land Surveyors and Proceedings of the Twenty-Eighth Annual Meeting since Incorporation Held in Toronto, Feb. 18th, 19th, 20th, 1920, Association of Ontario Land Surveyors (1920)

External links
Ogilvie in the New York Times, 1897
Biography from Alberta's Survey History
Early Days on the Yukon

Commissioners of Yukon
History of Yukon
People of the Klondike Gold Rush
Canadian surveyors
People from Ottawa
People from Dawson City
1846 births
1912 deaths
Persons of National Historic Significance (Canada)
Fellows of the Royal Geographical Society